Caino is a comune in the province of Brescia, in Lombardy located in the Valle del Garza.  It is bounded by other communes of Nave and Lumezzane.

Geography 

Caino is distant almost 12 km (7,46 mi) from Brescia. It borders with other five communes: Agnosine, Lumezzane, Nave, Serle and Vallio Terme. It's located in the Valle del Garza, literally translated Garza's Valley. Garza is the stream which passes through the comune, its headwaters are in Lumezzane.

Topography 

The comune of Caino is divided into 14 streets (vie in Italian):
 Via Nazionale, the main street which connects Caino with the adjacent communes and which is part of the Strada Provinciale 237;
 Via Bagnolo;
 Via Follo;
 Via San Rocco;
 Via Grignole;
 Via Pianzano;
 Via Villa Sera;
 Via Fucina;
 Via Micinigo;
 Via Don Gino Pirlo;
 Via Folletto;
 Via Villa Mattina;
 Via Rasile;
 Via Tolzana.
The city hall is located in Via Villa Mattina, 9. The library in Via Folletto, 2. The sport center in Via Rasile. The Parish with the main church in Via Folletto 7/B.

References

Cities and towns in Lombardy
Municipalities of the Province of Brescia